Juliana Castro Irizábal (born 28 June 1991) is a Uruguayan footballer who plays as a forward for Club Nacional de Football. She has been a member of the Uruguay women's national team.

College career
Castro attended the Missouri Valley College in the United States.

Club career
Castro played in Uruguay for Inau, River Plate, Sportivo Artigas de Sauce, Rampla Juniors and Nacional.

International career
Castro played for Uruguay at senior level in two Copa América Femenina editions (2006 and 2010).

Personal life
Castro's older brother, Gonzalo Castro, is also a professional footballer who plays for Club Nacional de Football as a winger.

References

1991 births
Living people
Women's association football forwards
Uruguayan women's footballers
People from Trinidad, Uruguay
Uruguay women's international footballers
Pan American Games competitors for Uruguay
Footballers at the 2007 Pan American Games
Club Atlético River Plate (Montevideo) players
Rampla Juniors players
Club Nacional de Football players
Uruguayan expatriate women's footballers
Uruguayan expatriate sportspeople in the United States
Expatriate women's soccer players in the United States
Missouri Valley Vikings women's soccer players